USS Zirkel (ID-3407) was a cargo ship that served in the United States Navy from 1918 to 1919.

SS Zirkel was a Design 1015 ship built in 1918 at Oakland, California, for the United States Shipping Board by the Moore Shipbuilding Company. The U.S. Navy acquired her on 27 September 1918 for World War I service with the Naval Overseas Transportation Service, assigned her Identification Number (Id. No.) 3407, and commissioned her the same day as USS Zirkel (Id. No. 3407) at San Francisco, California.

Zirkel got underway for the Gulf of Mexico with a cargo of nitrates. Steaming via the Panama Canal, she arrived at New Orleans, Louisiana, on 30 January 1919 and unloaded her cargo.

Following repairs to her turbines, Zirkel filled her holds with cotton, coffee, and steel and put to sea on 6 February 1919. After a 21-day voyage, she entered port at Liverpool, England, and began unloading her cargo.

Zirkel then took on about 800 tons of iron ore and headed back to the United States on 13 March 1919. On 29 March 1919, the freighter arrived in Philadelphia, Pennsylvania, and, after unloading, began preparations for demobilization.

On 3 May 1919, Zirkel was decommissioned and was returned to the custody of the United States Shipping Board, once again becoming SS Zirkel. The Shipping Board retained her until she was scrapped at Baltimore, Maryland, in 1929.

References

Department of the Navy: Naval Historical Center Online Library of Selected Images: U.S. Navy ships: USS Zirkel (Id. No. 3407), 1918-1919

Design 1015 ships of the United States Navy
Ships built in Oakland, California
1918 ships
World War I cargo ships of the United States
World War I auxiliary ships of the United States